The 1962 African Cup of Nations Final was a football match that took place on 21 January 1962 at the Hailé Sélassié Stadium in Addis Ababa, Ethiopia, to determine the winner of the 1962 African Cup of Nations, the football championship of Africa organized by the Confederation of African Football (CAF).

Ethiopia beat United Arab Republic 4−2 after extra time,  winning their 1st and only title.

Road to the final

Match

Details

References

Final
1962
African Cup of Nations Final
African
African
January 1962 sports events in Africa
20th century in Addis Ababa
Sport in Addis Ababa